Carl Arnold Gonzenbach (July 21, 1806 – June 13, 1885) was a Swiss painter.

References
This article was initially translated from the German Wikipedia.

19th-century Swiss painters
Swiss male painters
1806 births
1885 deaths
19th-century Swiss male artists